Teldenia latilinea is a moth in the family Drepanidae. It was described by Watson in 1961. It is found on Sulawesi.

References

Moths described in 1961
Drepaninae